Holly Whitford (born 11 February 1999) is an Australian rules footballer who played in the AFL Women's (AFLW). She played four matches over a two-year tenure with Collingwood between 2018 and 2019 and played four matches with Richmond in 2020 before being placed on the inactive list in 2021 prior to her delisting at the end of the season.

AFL Women's career
Whitford was drafted by Collingwood with the club's first selection and the fourth pick overall in the 2017 AFL Women's rookie draft. She made her debut in the thirteen point loss to Fremantle at Optus Stadium in round 2 of the 2018 season.

In April 2019, Whitford was delisted by Collingwood.

Wood was drafted by Richmond with the club's fifth pick and the 43rd selection overall in the 2019 AFL Women's draft.

She made her Richmond debut in the club's inaugural game against Carlton at Ikon Park.

Whitford was placed onto the club's inactive list for the entirety of the 2021 season due to a persistent foot injury. At the end of the season, she was delisted by the club.

Statistics
Statistics are correct to the end of the 2020 season.

|- style="background-color: #eaeaea"
! scope="row" style="text-align:center" | 2018
|style="text-align:center;"|
| 28 || 3 || 0 || 0 || 8 || 4 || 12 || 4 || 10 || 0.0 || 0.0 || 2.7 || 1.3 || 4.0 || 1.3 || 3.3
|- 
! scope="row" style="text-align:center" | 2019
|style="text-align:center;"|
| 28 || 1 || 0 || 0 || 4 || 0 || 4 || 2 || 3 || 0.0 || 0.0 || 4.0 || 0.0 || 4.0 || 2.0 || 3.0
|- style="background-color: #eaeaea"
! scope="row" style="text-align:center" | 2020
|style="text-align:center;"|
| 20 || 4 || 0 || 0 || 16 || 3 || 19 || 0 || 7 || 0.0 || 0.0 || 4.0 || 0.8 || 4.8 || 0.0 || 1.8
|- class="sortbottom"
! colspan=3| Career
! 8
! 0
! 0
! 28
! 7
! 35
! 6
! 20
! 0.0
! 0.0
! 3.5
! 0.9
! 4.4
! 0.8
! 2.5
|}

References

External links

 

1999 births
Living people
Collingwood Football Club (AFLW) players
Australian rules footballers from Melbourne
Sportswomen from Victoria (Australia)
Melbourne University Football Club (VFLW) players
Richmond Football Club (AFLW) players